The list of ship commissionings in 1918 includes a chronological list of ships commissioned in 1918.  In cases where no official commissioning ceremony was held, the date of service entry may be used instead.


See also

References 

1918
 Ship commissionings